Oraovica may refer to:

Oraovica, Radoviš, a village in the municipality of Radoviš, North Macedonia
Oraovica (at Crkovnica), a village in the municipality of Leskovac, Serbia
Oraovica (at Grdelica), a village in the municipality of Leskovac, Serbia
Oraovica (Preševo), a village in the municipality of Preševo, Serbia
Oraovica (Zvečan) (sr), a village in the municipality of Zvečan
Oraovica (Kosovska Kamenica) (sr), a village in the municipality of Kosovska Kamenica

or:
Gornja Oraovica, a village in the municipality of Dvor, Croatia
Donja Oraovica, a village in the municipality of Dvor, Croatia